American singer Kesha made her international debut in early 2009 featuring on the Flo Rida single "Right Round", which reached number one on the Billboard Hot 100 in the United States and topped the charts in five other countries. Kesha's debut album, Animal, released in January 2010, topped the Canadian and American charts, debuting at number one in its first week on the Billboard 200. The album's lead single, and Kesha's solo debut single, "Tik Tok", was released in August 2009 and reached number one in eleven countries and spent nine consecutive weeks on top of the Billboard Hot 100. Since its release in 2009, the song has sold 15 million copies worldwide, therefore making it the best-selling digital single of all time. The album spawned three more hit singles, "Blah Blah Blah", "Your Love Is My Drug" and "Take It Off". She topped eight charts on the 2010 Billboard Year-End Chart, including Top New Artists, Hot 100 Songs and Hot 100 Artists.

The commercial and critical success of her first album led to plans of a deluxe edition of the album titled Cannibal, which was ultimately released as an extended play in November 2010. Its lead single, "We R Who We R", reached the top ten in ten countries, while peaking at number one in the United States, Australia, and United Kingdom. The EP's second and final single, "Blow", was released in February 2011 and also managed to peak inside the top ten of multiple countries.

Kesha released her second studio album, Warrior, in December 2012. The lead single, "Die Young", peaked at number two in the United States, while charting in the top ten of eleven other countries. Two more singles, "C'Mon" and "Crazy Kids", were also released from the album, but failed to match the success of the lead single. In October 2013, she was featured on Pitbull's single, "Timber", which peaked at number one in over fifteen countries, including the United Kingdom, Canada, and United States.  In April 2016, she released her first single in three years, a collaboration with Zedd, "True Colors".  It is the first song since her ongoing legal battle with producer Dr Luke. 2017 saw the release of Kesha's third studio album, Rainbow, which featured the single "Praying".

Released songs

References

 
Kesha
Kesha